Sumba is the largest island in the Congo River. It is the largest island in the Democratic Republic of the Congo .

References

Islands of the Democratic Republic of the Congo
River islands of Africa
Congo River